Oceanithyris is a monotypic genus of brachiopods belonging to the family Dyscoliidae. The only species is Oceanithyris juveniformis.

The species is found in northeastern Pacific Ocean.

References

Terebratulida
Brachiopod genera
Monotypic brachiopod genera